Bathily is a surname. Notable people with the surname include:

Abdoulaye Bathily (born 1947), Senegalese politician
Cheick Bathily (born 1982), Malian football player
Djegui Bathily (born 1977), Senegalese judoka
Hadama Bathily (born 1985), French football player
Mohamed Aly Bathily, Malian politician
Samba Bathily (born 1971), Malian businessman and philanthropist